Parmouti 13 - Coptic Calendar - Parmouti 15

The fourteenth day of the Coptic month of Parmouti, the eighth month of the Coptic year. In common years, this day corresponds to April 9, of the Julian Calendar, and April 22, of the Gregorian Calendar. This day falls in the Coptic Season of Shemu, the season of the Harvest.

Commemorations

Saints 

 The departure of Pope Maximus, the 15th Patriarch of the See of Saint Mark 
 The departure of Saint Ehron the Syrian

References 

Days of the Coptic calendar